"Never Going Back Again" is a song written by Lindsey Buckingham that was first released by the British-American rock band Fleetwood Mac on their eleventh studio album Rumours (1977). The song was also released as the B-side to the Top Ten single "Don't Stop" in the US and the "You Make Loving Fun" single in the UK. It was also the B-side of "Dreams" in the Netherlands. "Never Going Back Again" has been covered by other artists, including Colin Reid and Matchbox Twenty.

Fleetwood Mac version
Music historian George Case described "Never Going Back Again" as a "gorgeous" song with "bubbly SoCal philosophies about relationships." It is one of several songs on Rumours that Buckingham wrote in the wake of the breakup of his relationship with fellow Fleetwood Mac member Stevie Nicks. Buckingham recalls it being one of the last songs written for the album, after he had started a rebound relationship with another woman. Buckingham regards it as a sweet and naive song and does not consider the lyrics to be very deep. He has described it as a "miniature perception of things." The song reflects a desire not to repeat previous mistakes. Buckingham accompanies himself on acoustic guitar played using a Travis picking technique. Buckingham drew further inspiration from session guitarist Ry Cooder. To capture the optimal sound, producer Ken Caillat asked Buckingham if they could restring his acoustic guitar every 20 minutes, which Buckingham agreed to. Even though Caillat pitied the guitar tech's job of restringing the acoustic guitar three times an hour for "the entire day", he approved of Buckingham's "magnificent" instrumental passages.

"Never Going Back Again" is set in a  signature at a moderate tempo of 88 beats per minute, in the key of G flat major. Buckingham's guitar is in drop D tuning with a capo on the fourth fret. Buckingham's voice spans from a C#3 to A#4. When overdubbing his vocals, Buckingham realized that he had played his acoustic guitar part in the wrong key, so he had to record the song from scratch the following day.

The working title for the song was "Brushes" because it was originally recorded with just Buckingham playing acoustic guitar and fellow band member Mick Fleetwood playing a snare drum using drum brushes. In the song's final release, the snare drum was removed. However, the drums and lead guitar part that were removed from the original release was restored as a bonus track for the DVD-audio release of Rumours. The alternate mix, created by Caillat, was received well by Fleetwood, who encouraged Caillat to place "Brushes" in the running order for the 2004 remaster of Rumours. According to Billboard reviewer Christopher Walsh, these parts represent "a pleasant surprise that adds to the song's emotional punch."

Critical reception and legacy
Rolling Stone critic John Swenson describes "Never Going Back Again" as "the prettiest thing on [Rumours]", noting that the "delightful" vocal "belies the bad-news subject matter." Stylus Magazine critic Patrick McKay regards it as one of the "strongest tracks" on Rumours. While Spin critic Chuck Eddy described "Never Going Back Again" as "an arty trance." Fleetwood Mac biographer Cath Carroll praises "Never Going Back Again" as "a melodically uncluttered song with a simple chorus and a sharp resolve that says everything in a few elegant phrases."

"Never Going Back Again" has appeared on several Fleetwood Mac compilation albums, including 25 Years – The Chain in 1992 and The Very Best of Fleetwood Mac in 2002. The song has also appeared on several live albums. An edited, twelve second shorter version appeared on some later vinyl and CD releases.

Personnel
Lindsey Buckingham – acoustic guitar, vocals

Charts

Certifications

Cover versions
Matchbox Twenty covered "Never Going Back Again" on Legacy: A Tribute to Fleetwood Mac's Rumours.  The Matchbox Twenty version is set in a minor key.  Billboard Magazine critic Steve Knopper describes this version as "gloomy."  Billboard writer Chuck Taylor describes this version as updating the original version's "unassuming demeanor with a subtly aggressive chug-along rock pulse." According to Matchbox Twenty drummer Paul Doucette, the band intended to play around with the song before coming up with their dark interpretation of what Doucette calls "a sad record when you think about it." Doucette felt that the version they came up with "turned out great."  Matchbox Twenty lead vocalist Rob Thomas stated that "we took drums from 'Tusk' and put them in there and at the end, turned it into 'The Chain.' We used all minor chords and made it real brooding."

Guitarist Colin Reid covered "Never Going Back Again" on his 2001 album Tilt, with Eddi Reader providing the vocals. AllMusic critic Ronnie D. Lankford Jr. described this version as "lovely," stating that it "offer[s] a fresh take on a perhaps overplayed classic."

The guitar part from "Never Going Back Again" was used (albeit in a lower key than in the Fleetwood Mac version) in a 2014 television commercial for Bank of America.

Danish experimental pop band Slaraffenland covered "Never Going Back Again", inserting free-form jazz figures and changing the instrumentation while keeping the "sunny" sound of the original.

References

External links
 

Fleetwood Mac songs
1977 songs
Songs written by Lindsey Buckingham
Song recordings produced by Ken Caillat
Song recordings produced by Richard Dashut
Matchbox Twenty songs
Warner Records singles